USS Minneapolis-Saint Paul may refer to:

 , the twenty-first , in commission from 1984 to 2008
  is the eleventh , currently in commission.

Other ships with either Minneapolis or Saint Paul as their name include;
, was a cruiser in service from 1894 to 1921
, was a heavy cruiser commissioned in 1934, in heavy action throughout the Pacific War, and decommissioned in 1947
 , a former passenger liner which was refitted into a Saint Louis-class auxiliary cruiser and was in commission in 1898, and again from 1917 to 1919.
 , a  heavy cruiser in commission from 1945 to 1971.

See also

United States Navy ship names